Cancer Causes & Control is a peer-reviewed medical journal published by Springer Science+Business Media, covering research on the epidemiology, causes, and control of cancer. According to the Journal Citation Reports, the journal has a 2020 impact factor of 2.506.

References

External links 
 

Oncology journals
Publications established in 1990
Monthly journals
English-language journals
Springer Science+Business Media academic journals